Sir John Anderson, 1st Baronet,  may refer to:
 Sir John Anderson, 1st Baronet, of Mill Hill (c.1736–1813), British politician, MP for the City of London, 1793–1806
 Sir John Anderson, 1st Baronet, of Harrold Priory (1878–1963), Scottish businessman, writer and lecturer

See also
John Anderson (disambiguation)